One justice of the seven-member North Carolina Supreme Court and five judges of the 15-member North Carolina Court of Appeals were elected by North Carolina voters on November 8, 2016, concurrently with other state elections. Terms for seats on each court are eight years.

Elections for seats on both courts were technically nonpartisan, but under a bill passed by the legislature and signed into law by Gov. Pat McCrory in 2015, House Bill 8, the party affiliations of Court of Appeals candidates were printed on the ballot. Court of Appeals candidates of all party affiliations would still run in one primary under the law, while the top two vote-getters, regardless of party, would advance to the general election. Primary elections would have been held on March 15, 2016, for seats with more than two candidates, but in the end, only two candidates filed for each Court of Appeals seat.

Supreme Court (Edmunds seat)
The seat held by Robert H. Edmunds, Jr. was on the 2016 ballot. Under current state law, Edmunds would have to relinquish his seat in 2021 if he was re-elected in 2016, because he would reach mandatory retirement age.

A 2015 change in state law was set to make Edmunds the first sitting justice who had the option of running in a retention election rather than running against other candidates. Edmunds chose that option, which would have meant that the state's voters would only be able to vote "for" or "against" Edmunds in the November election. If a majority of voters voted "against," the Governor would appoint a new justice to serve until the next general election. Critics cast this as an attempt by Republicans in the legislature to maintain the 4-3 Republican majority on the Court. Edmunds is a Republican, as is the current governor, who would appoint any replacement. Attorney Sabra Faires and two voters filed a lawsuit, claiming the new election method violated the Constitution of North Carolina and was not an election at all, but a referendum. Faires said she wanted to run for the seat. A three-judge panel found in favor of Faires and the two voters, and the State Board of Elections established a new candidate filing period of March 16–25. If more than two candidates filed for the seat, there would be a primary election on June 7.

Edmunds and Faires both filed to run for the seat on March 16. Wake County Superior Court Judge Michael R. Morgan then filed on March 21, and was joined later by attorney Daniel Robertson, setting up a primary.

The state Supreme Court later split 3-3 (with Edmunds recusing himself) on the constitutionality of the retention election, leaving the lower court ruling intact.

Morgan defeated Edmunds in the general election, garnering more than 54 percent of the vote. Morgan's victory gave the Supreme Court a Democratic majority for the first time since the 1998 elections.

Primary election

Candidates
Robert H. Edmunds, Jr. (Republican), incumbent Associate Justice of the Supreme Court of North Carolina
Sabra Jean Faires (Unaffiliated), former assistant North Carolina Secretary of Revenue
Michael R. Morgan (Democratic), Wake County superior court judge
Dan Robertson (Republican), former general counsel for the Bank of Carolinas

Results

General election

Polling

Results

Court of Appeals (Dietz seat)
The seat held by Richard Dietz, who was appointed to the Court in 2014, was on the 2016 ballot.

General election

Candidates
Richard Dietz (Republican), incumbent Judge
Vince Rozier (Democratic), Wake County district court judge

Results

Court of Appeals (Geer seat)
Judge Martha Geer announced on March 16, 2016, that she would resign to return to private practice. Consequently, the seat was on the November 2016 ballot. Because of the timing of Geer's resignation, there would be no primary election. In the interim, Gov. Pat McCrory appointed Chief District Court Judge Wendy Enochs to fill the seat.

Hunter Murphy, a Republican who ran for a Court of Appeals seat in 2014, declared his candidacy on March 17, 2016. Murphy is a trial attorney in Waynesville and was endorsed by retired North Carolina Supreme Court Justice Robert (Bob) Orr, the North Carolina Troopers Association and the North Carolina Fraternal Order of Police.

Wake County District Court Judge Margaret Eagles, a Democrat, was also a candidate for the seat, and was endorsed by Judge Geer, former Chief Justice Burley Mitchell, and the NC Police Benevolent Association.

Forsyth County-based attorney Donald R. Buie, not affiliated with any party, was also a candidate for this seat.

General election

Candidates
Donald R. Buie (Unaffiliated)
Margaret Eagles (Democratic), Wake County district court judge
Hunter Murphy (Republican), trial attorney

Results

Court of Appeals (Hunter seat)
The seat held by Robert N. Hunter, Jr. was on the 2016 ballot. Under current state law, Hunter would have to relinquish his seat in 2019 if he was re-elected in 2016, because he will reach mandatory retirement age.

General election

Candidates
Abraham Jones (Democratic), Wake County superior court judge
Robert N. Hunter, Jr. (Republican), incumbent Judge

Results

Court of Appeals (Stephens seat)
The seat held by Linda Stephens was on the 2016 ballot. A Democrat, she ran for re-election, and was endorsed by former Chief Judges of the Court of Appeals John C. Martin, Sidney S. Eagles, Jr., and Gerald Arnold.

Under current state law, Stephens would have to relinquish her seat in 2022 if she was re-elected in 2016, because she will reach mandatory retirement age.

General election

Candidates
Phil Berger, Jr. (Republican), Rockingham County district attorney
Linda Stephens (Democratic), incumbent Judge

Results

Court of Appeals (Zachary seat)
The seat held by Valerie Zachary was on the 2016 ballot. She was appointed to the seat in 2015 to replace retiring Judge Sanford Steelman.
Zachary, a Republican, ran for a full term.

General election

Candidates
Rickye McKoy-Mitchell (Democratic), Mecklenburg County district court judge
Valerie Zachary (Republican), incumbent Judge

Results

References

External links
2016 Judicial Voting Guide from NC State Board of Elections

judicial
2016